Lebiomorphica is a genus of beetles in the family Carabidae, containing the following species:

 Lebiomorphica ochreorufa (Fairmaire, 1887)
 Lebiomorphica sanguinolenta (Basilewsky, 1955)

References

Lebiinae